Assyria Township is a civil township of Barry County in the U.S. state of Michigan.  As of the 2010 census, the township population was 1,986. The unincorporated community of Assyria Center is located on M-66 at the corner of Tasker Road.

Communities
Ceylon was the name of a post office in the township from 1888 until 1903.

Geography

Demographics
As of the census of 2000, there were 1,912 people, 714 households, and 564 families residing in the township. There were 744 housing units at an average density of 20.6 per square mile (8.0/km2). The racial makeup of the township was 97.65% White, 0.63% African American, 0.63% Native American, 0.16% Asian, 0.26% from other races, and 0.68% from two or more races. Hispanic or Latino of any race were 1.10% of the population.

There were 714 households, out of which 31.2% had children under the age of 18 living with them, 69.9% were married couples living together, 4.5% had a female householder with no husband present, and 20.9% were non-families. 16.8% of all households were made up of individuals, and 5.5% had someone living alone who was 65 years of age or older.  The average household size was 2.68 and the average family size was 3.02.

In the township the population was spread out, with 24.2% under the age of 18, 7.3% from 18 to 24, 27.6% from 25 to 44, 29.1% from 45 to 64, and 11.8% who were 65 years of age or older.  The median age was 40 years. For every 100 females, there were 105.8 males.  For every 100 females age 18 and over, there were 106.7 males.

The median income for a household in the township was $50,192, and the median income for a family was $53,188. Males had a median income of $39,375 versus $26,012 for females. The per capita income for the township was $20,908.  About 1.4% of families and 2.8% of the population were below the poverty line, including 1.1% of those under age 18 and 6.5% of those age 65 or over.

In 2009 the number of addressed structures was 875. The 2008 parcel assessment shows 1069 real properties at a SEV of $77,567,100 and 28 personal properties at a SEV of $1,019,300 personal.

Notable people 

The prominent scientist Lyman James Briggs was born and raised in Assyria. In the 1890s he attended the Briggs School (named for his grandfather, Clement Briggs, who donated the land) before going to college at Michigan State College, the University of Michigan and Johns Hopkins University. Following this he had a distinguished career as a scientist working in the U.S. federal government.
-->

References

External links
Assyria Township official website
2008 Assyria Township parcel maps
2005 Assyria Township aerial photos

Townships in Barry County, Michigan
Grand Rapids metropolitan area
Townships in Michigan